Hills and Co. v. Hoover, 220 U.S. 329 (1911), was a United States Supreme Court case in which the Court held the owner of a copyright is restricted to a single action against another to find, seize, and seek penalties for allegedly infringing copies of a work.

References

External links
 

1911 in United States case law
United States copyright case law
United States Supreme Court cases
United States Supreme Court cases of the White Court